Hakodate Hachiman Shrine (函館八幡宮, Hakodate Hachimangū) is a Shinto shrine located in Hakodate, Hokkaido. It is a Hachiman shrine, dedicated to the kami Hachiman. It was established in 1445. Its main festival is held annually on August 15. Kami enshrined here include Emperor Ōjin as Hondawake no mikoto (品陀和気命), Sumiyoshi no Okami (住吉大神), and Kotohira no Okami (金刀比羅大神). It was formerly a National Shrine of the Second Rank (国幣中社, Kokuhei Chūsha) in the modern system of ranked Shinto Shrines.

See also
Hachiman shrine

External links
Data page From Hokkaido Jinjacho

Beppyo shrines
1445 establishments in Asia
Shinto shrines in Hokkaido
15th-century establishments in Japan
Hachiman shrines
Religious buildings and structures completed in 1445
15th-century Shinto shrines